The Robert Raiford Home and Farm is a historic house in Victoria, Mississippi, U.S. It was built from 1850 to 1855 for Robert Raiford, a farmer. It has been listed on the National Register of Historic Places since August 28, 1998.

References

Houses on the National Register of Historic Places in Mississippi
Greek Revival architecture in Mississippi
Houses completed in 1855
National Register of Historic Places in Marshall County, Mississippi
Farms in Mississippi
1855 establishments in Mississippi
Historic districts on the National Register of Historic Places in Mississippi
Agricultural buildings and structures on the National Register of Historic Places in Mississippi